The 2019–20 season is Godoy Cruz's 13th consecutive season in the top division of Argentine football. In addition to the Primera División, the club are competing in the Copa Argentina, Copa de la Superliga and Copa Libertadores.

The season generally covers the period from 1 July 2019 to 30 June 2020.

Review

Pre-season
Godoy Cruz had signed five players by 15 June 2019. Gabriel Alanís was the first name through the door, with the left midfielder joining on 27 May from relegated Belgrano; who they'd also sign Juan Brunetta from on 15 June. Four days prior, on 11 June, the club announced a trio of signings in Sebastián Lomonaco (Arsenal de Sarandí), Joaquín Mateo (Gimnasia y Tiro) and Leandro Vella (Instituto). On 15 June, Brian Alferez agreed a loan move away to Mendoza's Gimnasia y Esgrima (M). Godoy Cruz returned to action with a double-header against their reserves on 22 June, subsequently having a victory and a draw; with Brunetta scoring on debut in the former. Leandro Lencinas, a winger, and Agustín Verdugo, a central midfielder, departed to second tier club Mitre on 25 June.

Luciano Abecasis followed Lencinas and Verdugo out the exit on 26 June, penning terms with Lanús. The transfer of Ángel González to Estudiantes was agreed on 27 June, though would be subject to a medical and contract terms. Néstor Breitenbruch returned to his homeland after a season in Mexican football on 28 June, sealing a deal with Godoy Cruz to become their sixth newcomer. Their third friendly encounter, on 29 June, ended in a draw with Patronato. A second match with them was also played, with Agustín Manzur scoring to give Godoy Cruz a win. Numerous loans from the previous campaign officially expired on and around 30 June. 1 July saw Victorio Ramis leave on loan to Argentinos Juniors. Fernando Núñez headed off to second tier Sarmiento on 2 July.

Godoy Cruz suffered their first loss of pre-season on 3 July to Unión Santa Fe, though won the follow-up encounter thanks to goals from Miguel Merentiel and recent acquisition Joaquín Mateo. Ángel González's departure to Estudiantes was officialised on 6 July. Diego Sosa had a move to Argentinos Juniors confirmed on 6 July. Godoy Cruz lost twice to Newell's Old Boys in friendlies on 6 July. Facundo Cobos switched Argentina for Paraguay on 4 July, after agreeing a contract with Sol de América. Diego Viera officially did likewise on 8 July, after penning with Libertad during the preceding May. Godoy Cruz fought Mendoza-based Gimnasia y Esgrima in exhibition games on 11 July, avoiding defeat across two matches that saw Richard Prieto and Ezequiel Bullaude score.

July
Godoy Cruz progressed through the Copa Argentina round of thirty-two on 14 July, defeating Huracán in a penalty shoot-out that followed a 1–1 draw in normal time. Godoy hosted Palmeiras of Brazil's Série A in the Copa Libertadores round of sixteen on 23 July, as they surrendered a two-goal lead to end the first leg tied at 2–2. Days after, Dorados de Sinaloa announced the incoming of Danilo Ortiz from Godoy. On 27 July, the club lost to San Lorenzo in a five-goal thriller to open their Primera División campaign; debuting youngster Tomás Badaloni netted their first. Paraguayan centre-back Miguel Jacquet arrived at Godoy Cruz from Nacional on 29 July. Godoy fell to a 4–0 loss at Allianz Parque to Palmeiras on 30 July, as they exited the competition at the round of sixteen.

August
Arsenal de Sarandí condemned Godoy to their second league defeat in as many games on 5 August, as their opponents won by two goals at the Estadio Malvinas Argentinas. Godoy Cruz beat Deportivo Maipú in a friendly on 9 August, with the follow-up encounter ending goalless. Enzo Suraci went to Independiente Rivadavia on 13 August. 15 August saw Lucas Agüero depart on loan to All Boys. Atlético Tucumán defeated Godoy on 19 August in the Primera División, with a strike from Bruno Bianchi condemning them to their third straight league loss. Lucas Bernardi was subsequently sacked as manager, with Javier Patalano coming in as his replacement; Patalano had been reserve team manager. He won his first match in charge, as they beat Estudiantes on 25 August.

Godoy suffered their fifth overall defeat of 2019–20 on 31 August, as Racing Club secured a 3–1 win at the Estadio Presidente Juan Domingo Perón.

Squad

Transfers
Domestic transfer windows:3 July 2019 to 24 September 201920 January 2020 to 19 February 2020.

Transfers in

Transfers out

Loans out

Friendlies

Pre-season
In June, it was announced that Godoy Cruz would face league rivals Patronato (29 June), Unión Santa Fe (3 July) and Newell's Old Boys (6 July) in pre-season friendlies in Paraná, Santa Fe and Rosario. They would face their reserve team twice in the week preceding the Patronato encounter. Gimnasia y Esgrima of Mendoza were also an opponent of Godoy's.

Mid-season
Godoy played Deportivo Maipú in a mid-season match on 9 August.

Competitions

Primera División

League table

Relegation table

Source: AFA

Results summary

Matches
The fixtures for the 2019–20 campaign were released on 10 July.

Copa Argentina

Huracán were Godoy Cruz's opponents in the round of thirty-two of the Copa Argentina, with the tie to be played at the, as is customary, neutral venue of the Estadio Presidente Perón in Córdoba.

Copa de la Superliga

Copa Libertadores

Godoy Cruz were drawn to face Campeonato Brasileiro Série A outfit Palmeiras in the Copa Libertadores round of sixteen.

Squad statistics

Appearances and goals

Statistics accurate as of 1 September 2019.

Goalscorers

Notes

References

Godoy Cruz Antonio Tomba seasons
Godoy Cruz